Francine Van Hove (born May 5, 1942) is a contemporary French painter. 

Born in Saint-Mandé (Seine, France), she studied in Paris and received a Fine Arts degree with qualifications to teach in secondary schools.
After teaching one year at Lycee de Jeunes Filles in Strasbourg, she resigned from her position and decided to come back to Paris in 1964 where she now lives and continues to paint.

She is known for her paintings of young women with dreaming attitudes. Her graphic and pictorial techniques are reminiscent of Italian Renaissance painters and Flemish painters of the 16th and 17th centuries.
Her work now counts more than 400 paintings, all privately owned, as well as numerous drawings and pastels.

In 2014, Alain Blondel, her historic art dealer, retired after having promoted her work for 32 years. Since then, Francine Van Hove is represented by Jean-Marie Oger, former assistant at galerie Alain Blondel.

Main exhibitions 
2000 : Villa Beatrix Enea, Anglet.

2000 : Pavilion of Antiques and Fine Arts.

2001 : Alain Blondel Gallery, Paris.

2003 : Alain Blondel Gallery, Paris.

2005 : Alain Blondel Gallery, Paris.

2007 : Alain Blondel Gallery, Paris.

2009 : Alain Blondel Gallery, Paris.

2010 : Bellefeuille Gallery, Montreal.

2011 : Alain Blondel Gallery, Paris.

2012 : Alain Blondel Gallery, Paris.

2012 : Arts Elysees, Paris.

2014 : Alain Blondel Gallery, Paris.

2016 : The Prince's Eye Gallery, Paris.

2016 : Still Life - Style of Life, Jean-Marie Oger Gallery, Paris.

2016 :Bellefeuille Gallery, Montreal.

2019 : Florilège, Galerie JR in collaboration with Jean-Marie Oger, Arles.

2021 : On the side of home, Galerie Jean-Marie Oger, Paris.

Family 
Bernar, born Bernard Boulitreau,(1957-2006)  cartoonist at Charlie Hebdo, her brother
Paul Boulitreau French painter born in 1967, her nephew

References

External links 
 Galerie Jean-Marie Oger
 De Bellefeuille Gallery: Francine Van Hove
 Blog on Francine Van Hove

French women artists
French women painters
French contemporary painters
20th-century French painters
21st-century French painters
20th-century French women artists
21st-century French women artists
French contemporary artists
Modern painters
Living people
1942 births
Painters from Paris